The Castle is a 1968 West German film directed by Rudolf Noelte and starring Maximilian Schell, Cordula Trantow, Trudik Daniel and Helmut Qualtinger. It is based on the 1926 eponymous novel by Franz Kafka. The film won two German Film Awards. It was chosen as West Germany's official submission to the 44th Academy Awards for Best Foreign Language Film, but did not manage to receive a nomination. It was also listed to compete at the 1968 Cannes Film Festival, but the festival was cancelled due to the events of May 1968 in France.

The film's sets were designed by the art director Hertha Hareiter.

Cast
 Maximilian Schell as 'K'
 Cordula Trantow as Frieda
 Trudik Daniel as Innkeeper's Wife
 Friedrich Maurer as Mayor
 Helmut Qualtinger as Burgel
 Else Ehser as Mizzi
 E. O. Fuhrmann as Momus
 Karl Hellmer as Schoolmaster
 Benno Hoffmann as Uniformed Man
 Hanns Ernst Jäger as Landlord
 Iva Janžurová as Olga
 Georg Lehn as Barnabas
 Leo Mally as Gerstäcker
 Franz Misar as Arthur
 Johann Misar as Jeremiah
 Armand Ozory as Erlanger
 Hans Pössenbacher as Innkeeper
 Martha Wallner as Amalia

See also
 List of submissions to the 44th Academy Awards for Best Foreign Language Film
 List of German submissions for the Academy Award for Best Foreign Language Film

References

External links

 The Castle at Filmportal.de

1968 films
West German films
1960s German-language films
Films based on works by Franz Kafka
Films based on Czech novels
Films directed by Rudolf Noelte
1968 drama films
1960s mystery films
Films set in castles
1960s German films